Chi Ma Wan is a bay on southeastern Lantau Island, New Territories, Hong Kong. Chi Ma Wan Peninsula is where Chi Ma Wan, as well as Cheung Sha Wan, Tai Long Wan, Yi Long Wan and Mong Tung Wan are located. The Peninsula is located within the boundaries of Lantau South Country Park.

Correctional institutions

The Chi Ma Wan Correctional Institution is near Cheung Sha Wan on the peninsula. It was originally picked out by the Hong Kong Colonial Government as a site to house Russian refugees but in the end they decided not to build it and focussed on a prison instead. Established in 1956, it was the first open prison in Hong Kong. It is not currently in use. 

The Christian Zheng Sheng College, a school providing correctional services for students, is also located on the peninsula. It is a private institution not affiliated with the Hong Kong Correctional Services Department (HK CSD).

The Sea Ranch

The Sea Ranch is a housing estate developed by Hutchison Whampoa Properties in the late 1970s at Yi Long Wan on Chi Ma Wan Peninsula.

The Sea Ranch is only reachable from the sea as it is located on the coastline of the Lantau South Country Park and has no road access. Ferries from Central Ferry Piers no. 5 in Central to Cheung Chau take 30 minutes, then a private ferry from Cheung Chau to the Sea Ranch which takes 20 minutes. The ferry from Cheung Chau is free for residents and their invited guests, as the cost is included in the management fee paid by the residents. Only residents and their guests are allowed to visit the property.

There are no shops or restaurants within the estate and for this reason it is unique in Hong Kong. The original clubhouse and sporting facilities have been closed for a number of years and the estate is now a tranquil and peaceful enclave on the South Lantau coast.

See also
 Shap Long Reservoir
 Vietnamese refugee detention centres in Hong Kong
 Villages: Mong Tung Wan, Pui O, Tai Long and Shap Long

References

External links

Antiquities and Monuments Office. Archaeological Impact Assessment for Redevelopment of Chi Ma Wan Prison Area, Lantau Island
Sea Ranch Apartments NB This is not an official site. It advertises a privately owned apartment for sale.

Bays of Hong Kong
Lantau Island